Skold is the debut solo album released in 1996 by Tim Skold.

The song "Chaos" was used in the video game Twisted Metal 4 and the film Universal Soldier: The Return. The song "Hail Mary" can be found on the Disturbing Behavior soundtrack.

Track listing
All songs written by Tim Skold.
 "Chaos" – 4:14
 "Remember" – 4:58
 "P.A.M.F." – 3:29
 "Neverland" – 4:38
 "Void" – 4:17
 "Dust to Dust" – 3:54
 "Anything" – 4:07
 "Hail Mary" – 5:08
 "Devil Inside" – 4:19
 "Shut Up" – 3:15

Reception
Alan Escher of allmusic suggested that the album's lyrics may be "trying to tap into the incredibly dark overtones" used by Nine Inch Nails' Trent Reznor, but that the music "is almost always interesting, and [Skold] knows how to rock". He concluded that the album is good, although not "groundbreaking".

References

1996 debut albums
Albums produced by Scott Humphrey
Tim Sköld albums
RCA Records albums